Borodino was the lead ship of her class of five pre-dreadnought battleships built for the Imperial Russian Navy in the first decade of the twentieth century. Completed after the beginning of the Russo-Japanese War in 1904, Borodino was assigned to the Second Pacific Squadron that was sent to the Far East a few months after her completion to break the Japanese blockade of Port Arthur. The Japanese captured the port while the squadron was in transit and their destination was changed to Vladivostok. The ship was sunk during the Battle of Tsushima in May 1905 due to explosions set off by a Japanese shell hitting a magazine. There was only a single survivor from her crew of 855 officers and enlisted men.

Description 

The Borodino-class ships were based on the design of the French-built , modified to suit Russian equipment and building practices. They were built under the 1898 program "for the needs of the Far East" of concentrating ten battleships in the Pacific. The Borodino class were designed for a crew of 28 officers and 754 enlisted men, although they usually carried 826–846 crewmen in service.

The ships were powered by a pair of vertical triple-expansion steam engines, each driving one shaft, using steam generated by 20 Belleville boilers.

The main battery of the Borodinos consisted of four  Pattern 1895 guns were mounted in two twin-gun turrets, one each fore and aft of the superstructure. Their secondary armament of twelve  Pattern 1892 guns were mounted in six twin-gun turrets carried on the upper deck. Defense against torpedo boats was provided by a suite of smaller guns. The twenty  Pattern 1892 guns carried were mounted in casemates in the sides of the hull. The ships also mounted twenty  Hotchkiss guns in the superstructure. The ships were fitted with four  torpedo tubes, one each above water in the bow and in the stern, and a submerged tube on each broadside.

The  armored lower deck of Borodino and her sister  curved downwards to their double bottom and formed an anti-torpedo bulkhead.

Service 
Construction began on Borodino, named after the 1812 Battle of Borodino, on 26 May 1899 at the New Admiralty Shipyard in Saint Petersburg. The ship was laid down on 23 May 1900 in the presence of Tsar Nicholas II, and launched on 8 September 1901. She was completed in August 1904 at the cost of 14,573,000 rubles.

On 15 October 1904, Borodino set sail for Port Arthur from Libau along with the other vessels of the Second Pacific Squadron, under the overall command of Vice admiral Zinovy Rozhestvensky. Rozhestvensky led his squadron, including Borodino, down the Atlantic coast of Africa, rounding the Cape of Good Hope, and reached the island of Nosy Be off the north-west coast of French Madagascar on 9 January 1905 where they remained for two months while Rozhestvensky finalized his coaling arrangements. Two crewmen aboard the battleship died from the heat on 30 December. During this time, Rozhestvensky learned of the capture of Port Arthur and changed his destination to Vladivostok, the only other port controlled by the Russians in the Far East. The squadron sailed for Camranh Bay, French Indochina, on 16 March and reached it almost a month later to await the obsolete ships of the Third Pacific Squadron, commanded by Rear Admiral Nikolai Nebogatov. The latter ships reached Camranh Bay on 9 May and the combined force sailed for Vladivostok on 14 May. While exact figures are not available for Borodino, it is probable that the ship was approximately  overweight as she and her sisters were overloaded with coal and other supplies; all of which was stored high in the ships and reduced their stability.

Rozhestvensky decided to take the most direct route to Vladivostok using the Tsushima Strait and was intercepted by the Japanese battlefleet under the command of Admiral Tōgō Heihachirō on 27 May 1905. At the beginning of the battle, Borodino was third in line behind Rozhestvensky's flagship, . Very little is known of the ship's actions during the battle as there was only a single survivor from the ship and visibility was poor for most of the battle, but Captain W. C. Pakenham, the Royal Navy's official military observer aboard the Japanese battleship  under the Anglo-Japanese Alliance, noted that she was hit badly around 14:30, some 25 minutes after Russian ships opened fire. Borodino briefly fell out of her position after that hit, but apparently regained it by 14:50. By this time, she had a serious fire on the central portion of her superstructure.

Knyaz Suvorov suffered multiple hits early in the battle, some of which wounded Rozhestvensky and jammed the ship's steering so that she fell out of formation. Around 16:00, Borodinos captain, Petr Serebrennikov, now de facto commander of the fleet, turned Borodino south and led the Russian fleet out of sight. As Japanese cruisers closed in at around 17:05, he turned the fleet north to avoid them, but encountered the Japanese battleships an hour later. They concentrated their fire on Borodino and Imperator Aleksander III, both of which had lists from earlier damage. Pakenham noted a conspicuous hit on Borodino at 18:57 and she was observed to be on fire at 19:04 by observers aboard Tōgō's flagship . Pakenham observed two 12-inch hits on Borodino by the battleship  at 19:18 that started a massive fire. Ten minutes later, after Tōgō ordered his ships to cease fire and disengage, the battleship  fired her already-loaded 12-inch guns before turning away. One of these hit Borodino beneath her starboard forward six-inch turret and ignited the ready-use ammunition in the turret. The fire spread and caused a catastrophic detonation in a nearby six-inch magazine. Subsequent detonations of other magazines blew open her hull and the ship quickly capsized and sank. Only one crewman, Seaman First Class Semyon Yushin, survived the explosion from her crew of 855. He was rescued after surviving for twelve hours in the water.

Notes

Footnotes

Sources

Further reading 

Borodino-class battleships
1901 ships
Ships built at Admiralty Shipyard
Russo-Japanese War battleships of Russia
Shipwrecks in the Tsushima Strait
Shipwrecks of the Russo-Japanese War
Naval magazine explosions
Maritime incidents in 1905